Herman A. Porath (October 19, 1863 – April 20, 1938) was an American building contractor and politician.

Born in Germany, Porath emigrated with his parents to the United States and settled in the town of Winchester, Winnebago County, Wisconsin. Porath learned to be a carpenter and was a builder and contractor. Porath served as treasurer of the town of Vinland, Wisconsin and on the school board. In 1919, Porath served in the Wisconsin State Assembly and was a Republican. Porath died in Gillingham Corners in Neenah, Wisconsin after a period of ill health.

Notes

1863 births
1938 deaths
German emigrants to the United States
People from Winchester, Winnebago County, Wisconsin
Businesspeople from Wisconsin
School board members in Wisconsin
Republican Party members of the Wisconsin State Assembly